Funiculana is a genus of sea pens. It is the only genus in the family Funiculinidae. It contains three species:

Funiculina armata Verrill, 1879
Funiculina parkeri Kükenthal, 1909
Funiculina quadrangularis (Pallas, 1766)

References

Funiculinidae
Octocorallia genera
Bioluminescent cnidarians